Mesić is a Croatian surname. Notable people with the surname include:

 Jasen Mesić (born 1972), Croatian politician
 Marko Mesić (priest) (1640–1713), Croatian priest and soldier
 Marko Mesić (soldier) (1901–1982), Croatian soldier
 Matija Mesić (1826–1878), Croatian historian, the first rector of the University of Zagreb
 Milka Mesić (born 1939), Croatian public person
 Stjepan Mesić (born 1934), 2nd President of the Republic of Croatia
 Zlatko Mesić (1946–2020), Croatian footballer

Croatian surnames